Mitú is the capital town of the department of Vaupés in Colombia. It is a small town located in South eastern Colombia in the Amazon Basin. Founded in 1936, Mitú lies next to the Vaupés River at 180 meters above sea level. It is where the core of the services (transport and trade)  are provided to the Vaupés Department.

The Vaupés River serves as connecting link between Mitú and nearby hamlets on the riverbanks, but there are no roads connecting the town to rest of the country. Accessible only by airplane and sea, Mitú is the most isolated capital in Colombia.

History
The founding of Mitú can be traced to the rivalry between Brazilians and Colombians exploiting rubber in the basins and ranges of the upper Guainía and Apaporis rivers. By 1903 there was an intense activity exploiting rubber in the area around the Vaupés river using the local Indians, of the ethnic groups tucano and carijonas, as slaves.

Mitú was erected as a modest hamlet in October 1936 by Miguel Cuervo Araoz. The town served as a meeting point between different indigenous communities, in addition to being a center of rubber tree exploitation, fur trade and missionary center. Its main activity was the rubber trade for food, clothing and fuel. After being for a time a township, in 1963 Mitú became the capital of the Vaupés Commissary (Comisaria). In 1974, it was made a municipality and in 1991 it became the capital of the new created department.

In November 1998, an estimated 1,500 FARC guerrilla members of the Eastern Bloc of the FARC-EP tried to take over the town by force, against 120 National Police members and one Colombian National Army Battalion in the Siege of Mitú. The Colombian Air Force and Army Aviation supported ground forces with air raids. The guerilla members seized the airport, and they blew up a communications tower. Mitú was left partially destroyed and some estimated 150 policemen and soldiers died, along with 10 civilians and over 800 guerrilla members. In their escape FARC took hostages as human shields including some 40 to 45 members of the Colombian Military.

On June 13, two of the hostages captured in Mitú in 1998, National Police Col. (now Gen.) Luis Mendieta and National Police Col. Enrique Murillo were freed by the Colombian army in a rescue operation named Operation Chameleon, located in Calamar, Guaviare. The following day, two other police officers were found and freed.

Climate
Mitú has a tropical rainforest climate (Köppen Af) and is hot, humid and wet throughout the year.

References and notes

External links
 Mitu official website
 Territorial-Environmental Information System of Colombian Amazon SIAT-AC website

Municipalities of Vaupés Department
Capitals of Colombian departments
Road-inaccessible communities of Colombia